Siennica  is a village in Mińsk County, Masovian Voivodeship, in east-central Poland. It is the seat of the gmina (administrative district) called Gmina Siennica.

The village has a population of 2,600.

Historical overview
The village was first mentioned in early 15th century as Szenic. In 1526 Princess Anna founded the town of Janów at the site of Siennica. Two years later, a Catholic parish was established there. Notably, in 1564 the town returned to its old name according to census. In 1577 a new church was built with larch bales in place of an old one. A second church was constructed in 1693–1698, augmented by the construction of a monastery and church of Blessed Virgin Mary in 1749–1760. In 1864 the Russian imperial authorities liquidated the monastery (for more details see: Anti-Polish sentiment); nevertheless, two years later a theological college was founded there by the Catholics. In 1869 Siennica lost its civic rights by a Tsarist decree.

On September 13, 1939, Nazi German troops entered Siennica and burned it down.  Following Operation Barbarossa they deported about 700 Jewish residents of town to extermination camps.

The Red Army arrived on July 30, 1944, and in the course of action burned down the monastery church.

External links

 Oficjalna strona GKS Fenix Siennica 
 Oficjalna strona Zespołu Szkół w Siennicy 
 Jewish Community in Siennica on Virtual Shtetl

Villages in Mińsk County
Holocaust locations in Poland